Jeff Buxton is the coach of Lehigh University's post-graduate wrestling program and was the head wrestling coach at Blair Academy in Blairstown, New Jersey from 1982 to 2012.  During his tenure at Blair the program became the most successful high school wrestling program in the United States, winning the National Prep team title every one of Coach Buxton's 30 years at Blair and producing wrestlers who have gone on to win 12 individual NCAA crowns and 41 NCAA Division 1 All American places.

In 2012, Coach Buxton took the head coaching position at Lehigh University's post-graduate wrestling program, the Lehigh Valley Athletic Club (LVAC). At LVAC, Coach Buxton coaches senior-level wrestlers at U S senior National championships, the Pan American Games and the senior World Championships. On a selected basis, he also works with junior wrestlers who are competing internationally.

Personal highlights
In 1975, he was a National Prep Champion
Earned 13 varsity letters in football, wrestling and lacrosse
Wrestled undefeated through four seasons.
Named 1975 Rhode Island Athlete of the Year
Inducted into Providence Country Day School's Athletic High School Hall of Fame.
NCAA Qualifier in college at University of Rhode Island
Outstanding Wrestler in the 1980 Northeastern Regional Olympic Trials.

Coaching highlights at Blair Academy (1982 - 2012)
30 "National Prep Tournament" Team Championships
10 USA number one teams, from the 1995-1996 season through 2011-2012.

Personal achievements
themat.com "Wrestler of the Week May 2006"
He received a USA Wrestling's Lifetime Achievement Award during special banquet for the U.S. Olympic Committee and USA Wrestling other featured guest, Greco-Roman Gold Medal Champion Rulon Gardner.'

In presenting the Lifetime Achievement Award to Buxton, Blair wrestling parent Alan Meltzer said this about the man who coached his son: "I gave Jeff one of my most prized things in life, my son. The only thing that matters to a parent is his children. Jeff would be a mentor as a wrestling coach and as a human being. We made the right decision. Jeff's record is incredible."

Jeff's teams have been declared national champions among high school teams numerous times, and many of his student-athletes have gone on to become champions and college All-Americans.  Jeff is active in the state association, USA Wrestling New Jersey, where he serves as coach for the Cadet National and Junior National USA Teams compeating in Fargo, ND.  He is currently serving on New Jersey Coaches Council.

References

American wrestling coaches
Living people
Sportspeople from Warren County, New Jersey
High school wrestling coaches in the United States
Year of birth missing (living people)